The 2016 Kohler Grand Prix was the 9th round of the 2016 IndyCar Series. The event took place over 50 laps around Road America in Elkhart Lake, Wisconsin. The race was the first for IndyCars at the circuit since 2007 during the final season of the ChampCar World Series. It was the 26th time that the circuit had been used for IndyCar racing. 

Prior to the race weekend, doubts surrounded whether Josef Newgarden would be able to race due to injuries sustained during the 2016 Firestone 600. However, he was cleared by doctors to participate in opening practice and, later, for all sessions of the grand prix. In qualifying, Will Power went fastest, setting a time of 1:42.2105 to beat out Scott Dixon and Tony Kanaan. Championship leader Simon Pagenaud qualified fourth. Josef Newgarden and James Hinchcliffe both lost their two fastest times of their sessions, Newgarden for bringing out a red flag after spinning in turn 9 and Hinchcliffe for impeding the laps of Juan Pablo Montoya and Alexander Rossi. They started 20th and 22nd respectively.

At the start of the race, the first four positions remained as they qualified, while Graham Rahal moved up into fifth. In the rear of the field, Jack Hawksworth spun in turn five, moving him to the back of the field. Sébastien Bourdais came into the pits with damage to the rear wing assembly at the end of the first lap, putting him a lap down and ending his chances of taking victory. On lap 7, Scott Dixon pulled off course and rolled to a halt in turn five with engine failure, leaving him with a last place finish. With Dixon gone, Will Power was free to extend his lead over Tony Kanaan before the first round of pit stops. At the first round of stops, Power easily emerged back in the lead, but Kanaan was challenged by Graham Rahal for second place. The running order remained largely the same through the second round of pit stops, though Rahal would briefly pull into second after a quick pit stop before Kanaan passed him again later in the lap. However, both would fall back as Simon Pagenaud, on red tires, charged past both to move into second. As the race approached lap 40, the last round of pit stops came, with the running order remaining Power, Pagenaud, Kanaan, Rahal.

On lap 40, the race's only caution period came out after the rear suspension on Conor Daly's car failed, sending him off course and into the wall in turn one. This bunched the field up for a shootout to the end of the race. On the restart on lap 44, Power held his lead, while Tony Kanaan moved past Simon Pagenaud into second. In a repeat of the Indianapolis 500, Pagenaud reported that his engine had developed a misfire, causing him to drop quickly down the running order. At the front of the race, Kanaan was able to close the gap to Power down to only half a second by the final lap. However, Power had conserved most of his push-to-pass presses, allowing him to use them for most of the final lap and hold of Kanaan for the victory. Power's win was his second consecutive win and his 27th career victory, tying him for 13th with Johnny Rutherford for most career IndyCar victories. The victory also put Power in serious contention for the championship despite missing the first race of the season. Kanaan's second was his first podium finish since the previous season's race at Auto Club Speedway. Graham Rahal completed the podium as the highest finishing Honda driver in the race. Pagenaud's engine issue plummeted him all the way down the order to 13th, turning what seemed like a huge points day with Scott Dixon's engine failure into only a small gain. The highest finishing rookie of the race was Spencer Pigot, who came across the line in ninth. Josef Newgarden, despite his injuries, managed to finish in eighth place.

Report

Qualifying

Source for individual rounds:

Race Results

Notes
 Points include 1 point for leading at least 1 lap during a race, an additional 2 points for leading the most race laps, and 1 point for Pole Position.

Source for time gaps:

Championship standings after the race

Drivers' Championship standings

 Note: Only the top five positions are included.

References

External links

Official Pit Stop Data 

Official Race Broadcast

Kohler Grand Prix
Kohler Grand Prix
2016 Kohler Grand Prix
Kohler Grand Prix